Carex punctata, the dotted sedge, is a species of flowering plant in the genus Carex, native to Macaronesia, northwest Africa, southern, central, and northern Europe, and Turkey. Its chromosome number is 2n=68.

Subtaxa
The following varieties are currently accepted:
Carex punctata var. laevicaulis (Hochst. ex Seub.) Boott
Carex punctata var. punctata

References

punctata
Flora of Europe
Flora of Macaronesia
Flora of North Africa
Flora of Turkey
Plants described in 1811